Goodenia effusa is a species of flowering plant in the family Goodeniaceae and is endemic to Queensland. It is an annual herb with many stems, needle-shaped, often curved leaves, and racemes of yellow flowers with brown veins.

Description
Flowering mainly occurs from March to May and the fruit is more or less spherical, slightly flattened capsule  in diameter.

Taxonomy and naming
Goodenia effusa was first formally described in 2015 by Ailsa E. Holland in the journal Telopea from material collected near Georgetown in 2011. The specific epithet (effusa) refers to the species' diffuse, many-branched habit.

Distribution and habitat
This goodenia grows in open woodland in the area between Chillagoe, the Lynd junction, Croydon and Dimbulah in Queensland.

Conservation status
Goddenia effusa is classified as of "least concern" under the Queensland Government Nature Conservation Act 1992.

References

effusa
Flora of Queensland
Plants described in 2015
Endemic flora of Australia